Cropia subapicalis is a moth of the family Noctuidae first described by Francis Walker in 1858. It is found on Hispaniola and Jamaica.

References

Moths described in 1858
Hadeninae